is a 2008 Japanese light novel by written by Koroku Inumura and illustrated by Haruyuki Morisawa. An anime film adaptation was released in Japanese cinemas on 1 October 2011.

To Aru Hikūshi e no Tsuioku is a joint production by Japanese animation studios Madhouse and TMS Entertainment, and it was directed by the director Jun Shishido. The cast of this film was officially revealed on 19 May 2011.

Plot
Koroku Inumura's original war romance light novel revolves around Charles Karino, a Levamme Kingdom mercenary aerial pilot and Juana del Moral, a princess of del Moral family. Charles, who's the best fighter pilot in the entire Kingdom, lives with the mercenaries and is looked down upon by the regular soldiers of the Kingdom, but one day gets to man the twin-seater reconnaissance seaplane Santa Cruz after receiving a surprise assignment: to fly over 12,000 kilometers of enemy waters to protect aforementioned princess after her mansion gets bombed by the Amatsuvian Empire's fighter pilots and her father, Diego del Moral, dies. This mission would be a covert operation requiring the other mercenaries and forces to play the part of the decoy.

But after having suspicions from the start of the mission, Charles eventually discovers that both the original operation and the covert operation have been figured out by the enemy decoding the military telegraphs sent by the crown prince Carlo to Juana. Although this outrages Charles very much, he agrees to proceed with the mission. Throughout the whole mission, they become known about each other's character and history, thus becoming emotionally attached to each other, while hiding, surviving and defeating the worst attacks from the enemy, enduring hardships. At the end of the mission, even though Charles receives a hefty sum of pay disrespectedly, he throws it all away and goes away with his plane. It doesn't become clear what happened to him afterwards or whether those two met each other again or not.

Eventually, the princess after becoming Queen of Lavamme, goes on to create lasting peace between the two warring sides.

Cast

A Levammian born mercenary pilot who takes on a secret escort mission assignment to protect a girl who is the future Princess consort of the state. He is subject to severe racist discrimination due to his mixed heritage (he shares a half blood heritage consisting of the Amatsukami Imperium, the enemy state of Levamme Empire in the war). Due to his life long bad memory from racism, he was eager to prove himself and vows flying in the sky as an aviator as his life-long passion, because that "there is no caste, race, nor social status and other inequality among everyone" according to his own account. Although never officially recognized due to his race and social status as a flying ace, he is extremely talented at flying and aerial combat and that he is known to have out-gunned all the ace pilots within the kingdom in various drills and practices.

The "yet to be" Princess consort, an extremely beautiful woman with silvery hair. Although she has had an isolated life due to her royal birth, she is an elegant, polite, and compassionate lady by character. After a marriage proposal from the Prince of the state in the middle of the war, she is subjected to an assassination attempt conducted by the enemy. Therefore, to get her back to the mainland, the military high command has organized a secret escort mission, operated by Charles Karino, to get her past the enemy line and fly her back to the mainland of the state. Unlike many other fellow nobility and fellow countrymen, she detests racism towards half bloods and shows acceptance and respect to Charles. Although not noticed at the beginning, she once had another encounter with Charles in her childhood.

Manga
A manga adaptation, illustrated by Maiko Ogawa, was serialized in Shogakukan's Monthly Shōnen Sunday from August 12, 2009 to February 12, 2011. Shogakukan compiled its chapters into four tankōbon volumes, released from January 12, 2010 to September 12, 2011.

See also
The Pilot's Love Song, light novel series set in the same universe.

References

External links
  
 
 
 

2008 Japanese novels
2011 anime films
Anime films based on light novels
Aviation comics
Aviation novels
Films scored by Shirō Hamaguchi
Films with screenplays by Satoko Okudera
Gagaga Bunko
Japanese aviation films
2010s Japanese-language films
Light novels
Madhouse (company)
Shogakukan manga
Shōnen manga
TMS Entertainment